Darren Holmes may refer to:

Darren Holmes (baseball) (born 1966), Major League Baseball pitcher
Darren Holmes (footballer) (born 1970), Australian rules footballer
Darren T. Holmes, American film editor
 Darren Holmes (engineer)